The green oropendola (Psarocolius viridis) is a species of bird in the family Icteridae. It is found in wooded habitats in the Amazon basin and Guianas of South America, and is generally common. Uniquely among the oropendolas, the green oropendola has a pale bill with an orange tip. Male oropendola weigh around 400 grams, while females are in the 200 gram range. This is a common species and the International Union for Conservation of Nature has rated its status as being of "least concern".

Description

The head, breast and back are pale olive green, the wings are greyish-green, and the rump and underparts are chestnut. The central feathers of the tail are black and the outer ones yellow. The beak has an orange tip, and its base and the adjoining areas of skin are yellowish. The irises are pale blue and there is an inconspicuous crest on the back of the head.

Distribution
P. viridis has a very wide distribution in the tropical rainforests of South America. Its range includes Colombia, Venezuela, Guyana, Surinam, French Guiana, Brazil, Ecuador, Bolivia and Peru.

Ecology
This bird usually moves through the forest canopy in mixed species flocks. It is an omnivore, foraging for fruits and insects among the leaves and branches. By consuming whole fruits, it acts as a seed disperser. It is one of several birds that follow small groups of red-throated caracara (Ibycter americanus) through the canopy. The caracaras are specialist predators of wasp nests, and the oropendolas have been observed following the group for several hours, feeding independently and not necessarily at the same level in the canopy nor on the same items of diet.

Green oropendolas are gregarious, colonial birds and build long, bag-shaped nests that dangle from the branches of a tree. The birds are polygamous. The nests of green oropendolas are sometimes parasitised by the giant cowbird (Molothrus oryzivorus) which lays its eggs in their nests.

References

green oropendola
Birds of the Amazon Basin
Birds of the Guianas
green oropendola
Birds of Brazil
Taxonomy articles created by Polbot